Bruno Simma (born March 29, 1941 in Quierschied, Germany), is a German jurist who served as a judge on the International Court of Justice from 2003 until 2012.

He currently serves as an affiliated overseas faculty member of the University of Michigan Law School, teaching classes in Ann Arbor, and as one of the three third-country arbitrators on the Iran–United States Claims Tribunal, to which he was appointed in 2013.

Career

Positions as a Judge, Arbitrator, and Member of UN Expert Bodies

Simma served as a Judge on the ICJ from February 6, 2003 until his term expired on February 5, 2012; he was not a candidate for re-election.  From 1997 to 2003, Simma served as a member of the UN International Law Commission. From 1987 to 1996, he served as a member of the UN Committee on Economic, Social and Cultural Rights.

Simma has acted as an arbitrator in numerous inter-state, foreign investment, international commercial, and sports law cases.  Among them, he serves on the NAFTA Chapter 11 investor-state dispute panel in the Clayton/Bilcon case, in which a U.S. investor sought damages under NAFTA Chapter 11 after Canada and Nova Scotia rejected the investor's project to mine basalt and build a marine terminal on the Digby peninsula in Nova Scotia based on an environmental impact assessment conducted under federal and provincial law.  Simma was part of the controversial majority decision that found the Government of Canada liable to the investor.  The dissenting panel member warned that in key respects "the decision of the majority will be seen as a remarkable step backwards in environmental protection."

Academic Career and Honors
From 1995 to 1997, Simma served as dean of the University of Munich Faculty of Law. Prior to returning to his native Germany, he served as a lecturer at The Hague Academy of International Law in the Netherlands, where he also served as director of studies in 1976 and 1982, and as visiting professor at the University of Michigan Law School during 1995. From 1987 to 1992, he served as a Professor of Law at the University of Michigan Law School, and as a visiting professor in 1986. From 1984 to 1985, he served as a visiting professor at the University of Siena in Italy. He served as a lecturer for International Law for the German Federal Foreign Ministry's Training Centre for Junior Diplomats. He is member of the advisory board of the Goettingen Journal of International Law.

Among his approximately 120 publications, Simma is widely known as the editor of the authoritative The Charter of the United Nations: A Commentary (Oxford U. Press, 1994, 2nd and 3rd editions published in 2002 and 2012), over 2600 pages in its 3rd edition.  Simma's treatise is considered "the primary English reference book"  on the UN Charter, in particular for international law questions.

He has received honorary degrees from the Universities of Macerata, Glasgow and Innsbruck.

Notable ICJ Decisions
Jurisdictional Immunities of the State (Germany v. Italy)

Other activities
 Max Planck Institute for Comparative Public Law and International Law, Member of the Board of Trustees

References

External links
 International Court of Justice Biography
 Who's Who in Public International Law 2007 
 Jessup's 50th Anniversary Honorary Committee and 103rd ASIL Annual Meeting on International Law as Law, Fairmont Hotel in Washington, D.C., 25–28 March 2009
 

1941 births
Living people
International Court of Justice judges
21st-century German judges
German legal scholars
International law scholars
The Hague Academy of International Law people
Academic staff of the Ludwig Maximilian University of Munich
Academic staff of the University of Siena
University of Michigan Law School faculty
International Law Commission officials
People from Saarbrücken (district)
German judges of United Nations courts and tribunals